Vultaggio is a surname. Notable people with the surname include: 

Don Vultaggio (born 1951/1952), American billionaire co-founder of Arizona Beverage Company 
Lisa Vultaggio (born 1973), Canadian actress

See also
Voltaggio (surname)